Cheryl I. Harris is a critical race theorist and professor of civil rights and civil liberties at the UCLA School of Law.

Harris is widely known for "Whiteness as Property", published  in the June 1993 edition of the Harvard Law Review. In the paper, Harris describes the white racial identity and the value it confers in a slave society.

Harris is also the mother of American rapper, songwriter and record producer Earl Sweatshirt.

Early life 
Harris received her first degree from Wellesley College in 1973 and her J.D. degree from the Northwestern University Pritzker School of Law in 1978.

References 

American legal scholars
African-American legal scholars
UCLA School of Law faculty
Critical race theory
Wellesley College alumni
Northwestern University Pritzker School of Law alumni
Year of birth missing (living people)
Living people